Corticovirus is a genus of viruses in the family Corticoviridae. Corticoviruses are bacteriophages; that is, their natural hosts are bacteria. The genus contains two species. The name is derived from Latin cortex, corticis (meaning 'crust' or 'bark'). However, prophages closely related to PM2 are abundant in the genomes of aquatic bacteria, suggesting that the ecological importance of corticoviruses might be underestimated. Bacteriophage PM2 was first described in 1968 after isolation from seawater sampled from the coast of Chile.

Taxonomy
The genus contains the following species:
 Pseudoalteromonas virus Cr39582
 Pseudoalteromonas virus PM2

Other unassigned phages:
 Pseudoalteromonas virus GXT1010
 Marinomonas virus YY
 Vibrio virus fNo16

Virology
The virons consist of a round, icosahedral, non-enveloped capsid of a diameter of 60 nm and an internal lipid membrane located between outer and inner protein shell.  The shells are composed of three layers whose surfaces reveals a pattern with distinctive features, including bush-like spikes protruding from the twelve vertices.

The icosahedral capsid (T = 21) is 56 nanometers (nm) in diameter and is composed of 1200 P1 (spike) and 60 P2 (capsid) proteins. The pentameric receptor-binding spikes protrude from the 12 fivefold axes. The capsid encloses an internal lipid core containing the structural proteins P3 to P10.

Genome 
The genome is not segmented, constitutes 13% of the virus's weight and contains a single molecule of circular, supercoiled, double-stranded DNA of 10 kilobases in length. The genome has a g + c content of 43%. It encodes ~21 proteins.

Transcription is organised into three operons.

Replication of the genome is via a rolling-circle mechanism, initiated by the virus encoded endonuclease P12.

Life cycle

Viral replication is cytoplasmic. Entry into the host cell is achieved by adsorption to the host cell surface followed by fusion of the viral membrane with the outer membrane of the host cell and subsequent genome delivery into the cell interior. DNA-templated transcription is the method of transcription. Bacteria of the genera Pseudoalteromonas, Marinomonas and Vibrio serve as the natural host. Corticovirus PM2 is a lytic virus and at the end of the infection cycle disrupts the host cell using a unique lysis system consisting of phage-encoded proteins P17 and P18 as well as an unidentified host autolysin. However, identification of PM2-like proviruses in bacterial genomes indicates that other members of this family might be temperate viruses. Transmission routes are passive diffusion.

References

External links
 ICTV Online(10th) Report: Corticoviridae
 Viralzone: Corticovirus

 
Bacteriophages
Virus genera